= Nina Velekhova =

Russian theatre critic and writer

- Нина Александровна Велехова
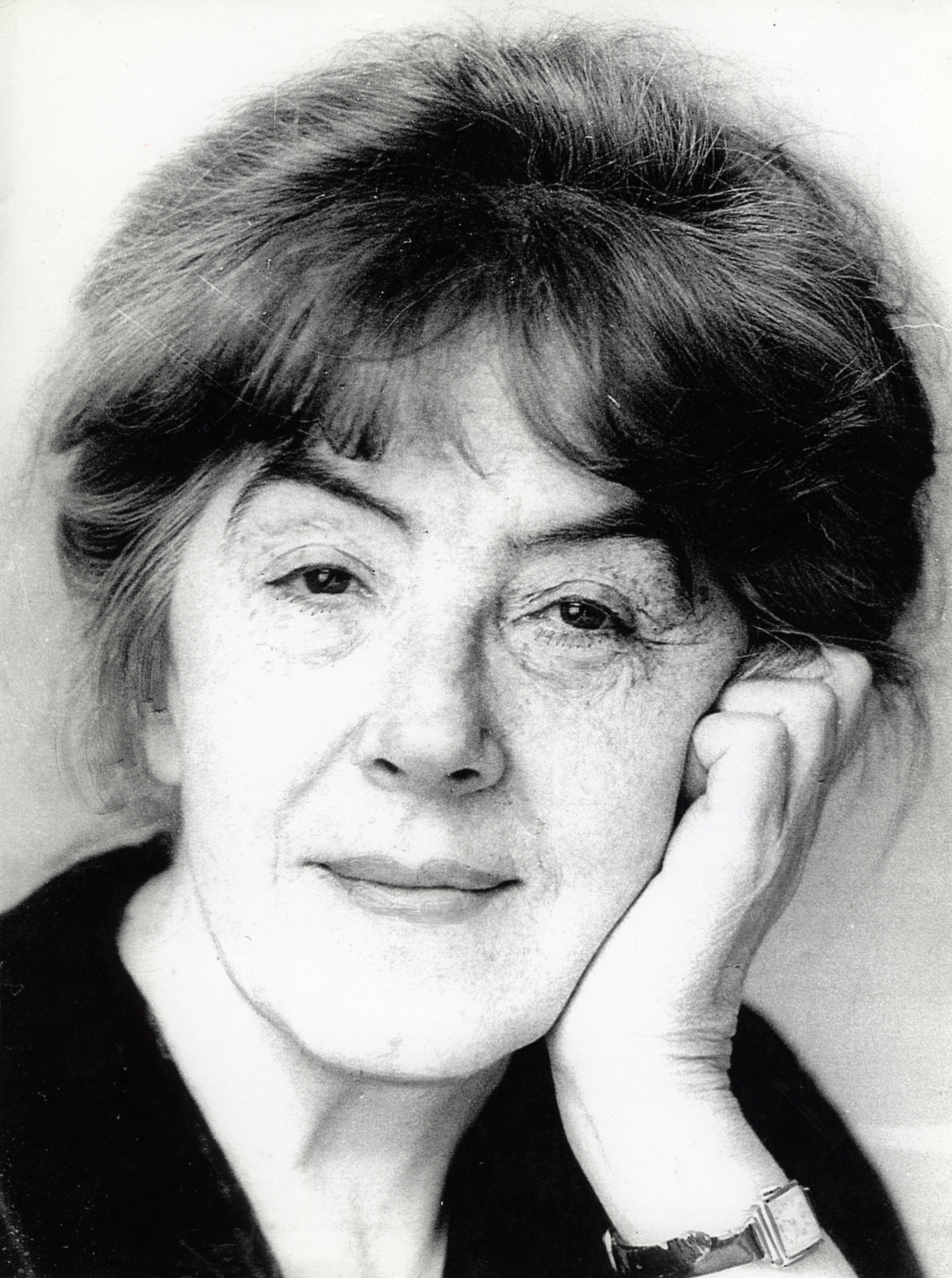
- Velekhova in Moscow, 1980
- Born: Nina Aleksandrovna Kannenberg; 10 December 1918; Moscow, Russian SFSR
- Died: 12 June 2007 (aged 88); Moscow, Russia
- Education: Russian Institute of Theatre Arts
- Occupations: Theatre critic, writer

Nina Aleksandrovna Velekhova (Russian: Нина Александровна Велехова; née Kannenberg; 10 December 1918 – 12 June 2007) was a Soviet and Russian theatre critic and writer. She was known as an observer and analyst of Soviet and post-Soviet theatre from the 1950s through the 1990s.

== Early life and education ==
Velekhova was born in Moscow. A biobibliographical reference book of Moscow writers records that she graduated from the State Institute of Theatre Arts in 1944.

== Career ==
Velekhova began publishing as a theatre critic in the mid-1940s and became associated with writing on Soviet theatre, drama and stage direction. The Russian Art Archive describes her as a theatre critic and writer who was an important analyst of theatrical processes in the Soviet Union and later in post-Soviet Russia.

She wrote on Soviet theatre directors and drama, including works on Nikolay Okhlopkov, Boris Ravenskikh and Valentin Pluchek. HSE University's Centre for Digital Archival Research describes her as a well-known theatre critic and the author of books on Soviet theatre and drama, including Okhlopkov and the Theatre of the Streets, When the Curtain Opens and Silver Trumpets.

Her 1970 book Okhlopkov and the Theatre of the Streets was published in Moscow by Iskusstvo in the Soviet series Life in Art. In 1999, she published Valentin Pluchek and the Comedians' Halt at Triumfalnaya, 2, a book on Valentin Pluchek and the Moscow Satire Theatre.

== English-language work ==
Velekhova was also published in English. She wrote sections for the book Eastern European Theater After the Iron Curtain, edited by Kalina Stefanova and published by Harwood Academic Publishers in 2000. These sections included an interview with Yury Lyubimov and an essay on Russian theatre in the 1990s.

== Selected works ==
- In Disputes about Style (1963).
- Okhlopkov and the Theatre of the Streets (1970).
- When the Curtain Opens (1975).
- Silver Trumpets: Soviet Drama Yesterday and Today (1983).
- Valentin Pluchek and the Comedians' Halt at Triumfalnaya, 2 (1999).
- "The State of Russian Theater in the 1990s", in Eastern European Theater After the Iron Curtain (2000).
